Graham E. Fuller (born November 28, 1937) is an American author and political analyst, specializing in Islamist extremism. Formerly vice-chair of the National Intelligence Council, he also served as Station Chief in Kabul for the CIA. A "think piece" that Fuller wrote for the CIA was identified as instrumental in leading to the Iran–Contra affair.

After a career in the United States State Department and CIA lasting 27 years, he joined Rand Corporation as senior political scientist specializing in the Middle East. As of 2006, he was affiliated with the Simon Fraser University in Vancouver, British Columbia, as an adjunct professor of history. He is the author of a number of books, including The Future of Political Islam.

Career
Fuller attended Harvard University, where he earned first a BA and then a MA degree in Russian and Middle Eastern Studies.

State Department
Fuller joined the State Department of the United States, entering the Foreign Service for assignments in Europe, Asia, and the Middle East.

CIA
He served 20 years as an operations officer in the CIA. Assignments include postings in:  Germany, Turkey, Lebanon, Saudi Arabia, North Yemen, Afghanistan, and Hong Kong. Fuller was Kabul CIA Station Chief until 1978, when he was brought to CIA headquarters in Washington, where he was appointed National Intelligence Officer for Near East and South Asia in 1982. In 1986, the CIA appointed him vice-chairman of the National Intelligence Council.

Iran–Contra Affair
In 1987, Fuller was identified as the author of a 1985 study that according to the New York Times was "instrumental" in the decision of the Reagan Administration to secretly contact leaders in Iran and "eventually led to the covert sale of United States weapons to Tehran in what became the Iran–Contra affair." The document suggested that the Soviet Union was in position to influence Iran and that the United States might gain influence by selling arms to the country. According to Fuller, he had revised his opinion as the situation developed, but though he had told Government officials, a written report on the change was not circulated. Fuller denied that the original "think piece" he had prepared with Howard Teicher was "tailored ... to support Administration policy."

After government

Fuller left the CIA in 1988 for the RAND Corporation, remaining as a senior political scientist until 2000. At the RAND Corporation he wrote, among many publications, on political Islam in various countries, and on the geopolitics of the Muslim world.

Fuller is an adjunct history professor at Simon Fraser University. He speaks several Middle Eastern languages as well as Russian and Chinese.

After the Boston Marathon bombing, it was revealed that Fuller's daughter Samantha Ankara Fuller (married name Tsarnaev) was married in the 1990s to Ruslan Tsarni (born Tsarnaev), the uncle of the perpetrators Dzhokhar and Tamerlan Tsarnaev. They divorced on April 26, 1999, in Orange County, North Carolina. Ruslan Tsarni worked for companies connected to Halliburton. He was also a consultant for a company contracted by the U.S. Agency for International Development (USAID) in the former Soviet Republic of Kyrgyzstan.

In 2012 Fuller established Bozorg Press, his indie experiment in self-publishing. (Bozorg means "large" or "great" in Persian)

On December 1, 2017, the Istanbul chief public prosecutor’s office issued an arrest warrant for Fuller based on his alleged involvement in the planning of the failed 2016 Turkish coup d'état attempt and a wealthy Turkish national offered a reward of 3-million Turkish lira (almost $800,000) for help in delivering Fuller and Michael Rubin to Turkey to answer the Turkish allegations. The Turkish arrest warrant alleges Fuller met with other individuals-of-interest-to-prosecutors on the island of Büyükada, near Istanbul, on the night of July 15, 2016, simultaneous to the attempted coup.

Fuller responded December 2017: "On the night of the coup attempt in Turkey last year I happened to have been addressing a group of 100 people or so right here in the town in western Canada where I have been living for the past 15 years." "I have not set foot in Turkey in the last five years." An unnamed U.S. official who was cited in a news report responded, "The notion that current or former employees of the United States Government were involved in the failed coup is absurd."

ISIS
A 2014 interview with Fuller quoted him as saying, "I think the United States is one of the key creators of [ISIS]. The United States did not plan the formation of ISIS, but its destructive interventions in the Middle East and the war in Iraq were the basic causes of the birth of ISIS.

Works

Books

Co-authored books

References

External links

 
 2006 & 2010 interviews, NPR
 2003 Interview, CNN
 

1937 births
American foreign policy writers
American male non-fiction writers
American political commentators
American political philosophers
American political scientists
Gülen movement
Harvard College alumni
Harvard Graduate School of Arts and Sciences alumni
Living people
Operation Gladio
RAND Corporation people
People of the Central Intelligence Agency
Academic staff of Simon Fraser University